The 2016 Junior World Weightlifting Championships were held in Tbilisi Sports Palace, Tbilisi, Georgia from 25 June to 2 July 2016. The competition was open to players aged 15–20 (born between 2001 and 1996).

Medal summary

Men

Women

Medal table
Ranking by Big (Total result) medals

Ranking by all medals: Big (Total result) and Small (Snatch and Clean & Jerk)

References

External links
Results Book

IWF Junior World Weightlifting Championships
International sports competitions hosted by Georgia (country)
Junior World Weightlifting Championships
2016 in Georgian sport
Weightlifting in Georgia (country)
Weightlifting